Monastero Bormida is a comune (municipality) in the Province of Asti in the Italian region Piedmont.

Monastero Bormida borders the following municipalities: Bistagno, Bubbio, Cassinasco, Denice, Loazzolo, Ponti, Roccaverano, and Sessame. It is home to a castle, located near the Bormida river, which originated as an abbey founded around 1050 (whence the town's name), and which has mosaics and frescoes  in the interior. There is also a Romanesque bridge crossing the same river.

References

External links
 Official website

Cities and towns in Piedmont